Heretoir is a German metal band formed in 2006 by David 'Eklatanz' C.

Discography

Studio Albums 
 Heretoir (2011)
 The Circle (2017)

EPs 
 Existenz Demo (2008)
 .Existenz. EP (2009)

Compilations 
 Substanz (2012)

Split Albums 
 The World Comes to an End in the End of a Journey (2009)
 Wiedersehen – unsere Hoffnung (2010)

Singles 
 Just for a Moment (2014)
 Golden Dust (2019)
 Graue Bauten (2022)
 Fatigue (2023)
 Anima (2023)

References 

Musical groups established in 2006